Niguza oculita is a species of moth of the family Erebidae first described by Swinhoe in 1901. It is found in Australia, including the Wessel Islands.

References

External links
 Images

Catocalini
Moths of Australia